MI-10 can refer to:
Mil Mi-10, Soviet helicopter

M-10 (Michigan highway)
MI10, British Military Intelligence, section 10